Sejong University (SJU) is a private university located in Seoul, South Korea known for its standing in hospitality and tourism management, dancing, animation and rhythmic gymnastics. Founded as the Kyung Sung Humanities Institute, it was renamed in 1978 to its present name in honor of Sejong the Great, the fourth king of the Joseon Dynasty and overseer of the creation of the Korean alphabet Hangul.

Sejong University has nine colleges: College of Liberal Arts, College of Social Sciences, College of Business Administration, College of Hospitality and Tourism Management, College of Natural Sciences, College of Life Sciences, College of Electronics and Information Engineering, College of Engineering, and College of Arts and Physical Education, and has a Faculty of General Education and seven graduate schools.

History

Beginnings (1940–1987) 

The history of Sejong University began in May 1940 when the Kyung Sung Humanities Institute was founded by Dr. Youngha Choo and Dr. Okja Choi. In 1947 the institute grew into the Seoul Women Teachers' Institute, with Dr. Choo as its first Director; the following year it was reorganized and became a junior college. In 1954 the school became Soodo Women Teachers' College. The college became a four-year institution in 1961 and in 1962 moved to its present campus in Kunja-dong. In 1966 the Graduate School was established. In 1973, the Soodo Museum (now Sejong University Museum), established to house the founders' collection of Korean antiquities, opened its doors to the public. In 1979 Soodo Women Teachers' College changed its name to Sejong College and admitted male undergraduates for the first time.

1987-2000 
In October 1987 Sejong College grew into Sejong University, consisting of five colleges with an enrollment of 6,000 students. In 1996, Dr. Choo Myung-Gun became Chairman of the Board of Trustees. That year saw the establishment of two new graduate schools (the Graduate School of Information and Communication and the Graduate School of Education) and four new engineering departments (Electronic Engineering, Architectural Engineering, Civil Engineering, and the evening division of Computer Engineering), as well as a Ph.D. program in Hotel Management and master's programs in Public Administration, Applied Statistics, and Computer Engineering. Total enrollment rose to over 7,000 by the fall semester of 1997 and since then enrollment has increased by about 1,000 new students each year. In 1998 the College of Tourism and the department of Biological Engineering were founded. Construction began on five new buildings, including the Library, the Chapel, and the engineering laboratories.

In 1999 three new graduate schools were added: Software Engineering, Science and Technology, and Performance Art Administration. The Materials Engineering department was established.

As a result of a cooperative agreement with Lockheed Martin Aerospace, the Sejong-Lockheed Martin Aerospace Research Center was founded to promote the development of the Korean aerospace industry, and similar agreements to cooperate in the development of science and technology were made with Hanaro Communication, Hansol PCS, Onse Communication, and Prime Company.

In 2000 the Graduate Schools of Film Art and Techno Design were founded; the Graduate School of Business Administration became the Graduate School of Global Business Administration; the College of Tourism became the College of Hotels and Tourism. The new Library opened, housing more than 400,000 volumes; it is the first WTO library in Korea.

2001-present 

In 2001 a collaborative relationship was established with the Korea Science and Culture Foundation. Two new programs taught in English opened: an M.A program in Asian Studies, and a Global M.B.A. program operated jointly by Sejong University and Syracuse University in the United States. In January 2002 a University Development Advisory Board, composed of the CEOs of 30 major Korean firms, was founded to strengthen the university's ties to industry. In 2002 the education Reform Deliberation Commission officially awarded Sejong University for successfully restructuring and renovating university. In 2004 the Ministry of Education & Human Resources Development recognized Sejong University for excellence in promoting originality, innovation, and academic achievement. In 2007 the Graduate School of Business received certification from the Association of Advanced Collegiate Schools of Business.

Academics

Schools and Major
Sejong University has nine undergraduate colleges and Faculty of Open major.
College of Liberal Arts
Korean Language and Literature
English Language and Literature
Japanese Language and Literature
Chinese Trade and Commerce
History
Education
College of Social Sciences
Economics and Trade
Public Administration
Communication Art
College of Business Administration
Business Administration
College of Hospitality and Tourism Management
Hospitality and Tourism Management
Food Service Management
Franchise Management of Hotel, Restaurant and Tourism
Hotel Restaurant Business
College of Natural Sciences
Mathematics
Applied Statistics
Physics and Astronomy
Chemistry
College of Life Sciences
Food Science and Technology
Biotechnology
Molecular Biology
Bio-resource Engineering
College of Electronics and Information Engineering
Electronics Engineering
Information and Communication Engineering
Optical Engineering
Computer Science and Engineering
Data Protection
Digital Contents
College of Engineering
Architectural Engineering
Architecture
Civil and Environmental Engineering
GeoInformation Engineering
Energy and Mineral Resource Engineering
Mechanical Engineering
Aerospace Engineering
Nano Technology and Advanced Materials Engineering
Nuclear Energy Engineering
College of Arts and Physical Education
Painting
Industrial Design
Fashion Design
Music
Physical Education
Dance
Cartoon and Animation
Film Art
Faculty of Open major

Graduate Schools 
Graduate School of Sejong University
Graduate School of Business
Graduate School of Public Policy
Graduate School of Education
Graduate School of Tourism
Graduate School of Interdisciplinary Arts
Graduate School of Industry

International Programs 
Exchange Student Programs
Dual Degree Programs (the University of Winchester, UK; Shanghai Jiao Tong University, China)
Joint Sejong-Syracuse MBA Program (Syracuse University, United States)
Summer Program (Johnson & Wales University, United States)
Short-term Language Program (Maryl Hurst University, United States; The University of Winchester, UK)

Research
The university has announced a plan to build a research complex consisting of the Green Energy Research Institute (GERI) and the Plant Engineering Research Institute (PERI) in Gwangju, Gyeonggi-do.

In 2002, the Ministry of Science and Technology named the University's Astrophysical Research Center for the Structure & Evolution of the Cosmos (ARCSEC) as the Best New Research Institute and awarded a research grant of 9 billion won over a 9-year period.
In 2007, the October issue of Molecular Cell published the groundbreaking article by Dr. Soo-Jong Um and his research team entitled, “Active Regulator of SIRT1 Cooperates with SIRT1 and Facilitates Suppression of p53 Activity.” The article describes a nuclear protein and active regulator SIRT1 (AROS). AROS is the first direct SIRT1 regulator to be identified to be modulating p53-mediated growth regulation.

In 2009, Dr. Jaewoo Lee of the Department of Astronomy and Space Science and his team published a paper in Nature entitled, “Enrichment by supernovae in globular clusters with multiple populations”, explaining the process of the formation of globular clusters. He also became the first South Korean scientist to win the right to use NASA's Hubble Telescope in 2010.
In 2009, the Ministry of Education, Science and Technology selected the University's Biotechnology Engineering Department as one of the select recipients of funding of 1.2 billion won over a 5-year period to undertake a research project to develop a groundbreaking technology. If successful, the new technology will allow dedifferentiating (reversing cell development) completely differentiated cells to turn them into stem cells, which will enable patients to use their own cells to repair, for example, their damaged liver.

In May 2010, Sejong University was named a Resource Development Specialization University by the Ministry of Knowledge Economy under the government's initiative to develop a pool of specialists in overseas resource development. The University will receive a funding of 10 billion won from the government to develop and train resource specialists. The Department of Energy and Mineral Resource Engineering has been added to further consolidate its leading position in resource development research in the country. The Department offers three majors: Climate Change Policy, Climate Change Science, and Climate Change Engineering.
In September 2010, Graphene Research Institute of Sejong University was selected as one of
the Priority Research Centers funded by the National Research Foundation of Korea under
the Ministry of Education, Science and Technology, and will receive a funding of 4.9 billion
won over 9 years.
In October 2010, Sejong University signed an MOU with Syngenta AG, a leading global Swiss agribusiness company, to develop new innovative breeds and research talents.

In December 2010, Dr. Sung-Eun Kim of the Department of Astronomy and Space Science was named as one of the Female Scientists of the Year by the Ministry of Education, Science and Technology (MoEST) the National Research Foundation (NRF) of Korea. She received the recognition for her continued contribution to science, which includes 60-odd papers on the Large Magellanic Cloud.

Rankings and recognition
In 2001, JoongAng Daily, one of the country's premier dailies, chose Sejong the “Most Remarkably Improved” university among 123 universities in South Korea. The Daily ranked the university at No. 16 overall in its 2002 University Listing. In 2008, the university was ranked No. 9 by the Daily among universities without medical schools and No. 4 in Faculty Research Accomplishments.

In April 2007, the university Business Administration Department became the fourth AACSB (the Association to Advance Collegiate School of Business) accredited business school in the country, following Seoul National University, Korea University and KAIST.

In the QS Asian University Rankings 2010: Top 200, Sejong University was ranked 181st among universities in Asia and 39th in Korea.

In 2010, MoEST named Sejong University one of the Best Universities  Educational Reform.

In 2012, Sejong University was ranked No. 40 among universities in South Korea by JoongAng Daily.

In 2013, Sejong University was ranked No. 26 among universities in South Korea by JoongAng Daily.

In 2014, Sejong University was ranked No. 4 in South Korea and No. 24 in Asia among small and medium-sized universities without a medical school by Chosun Ilbo-QS

In 2015, Sejong University was ranked No. 4 in South Korea and No. 18 in Asia among small and medium-sized universities without a medical school by Chosun Ilbo-QS

Campus

Sejong University's wooded 118,262 m2 campus is located at 98 Gunja-dong, Gwangjin-gu, in eastern Seoul north of the Han river, the capital of South Korea. Located directly across from the Seoul Children's Grand Park, the campus consists of 23 buildings, including the Sejong Private Elementary School building and the Student Center. The campus is a showcase of buildings built in Korean traditional styles.

The campus can be accessed by public transport by Metro subway and buses.

Sejong Elementary School
Sejong Elementary School(세종초등학교), also known as Sejong University Elementary School(세종대학교 부설 세종초등학교), is a private elementary school founded by Sejong University. Son Yeon Jae and many other famous alumni have attended the school.

The Sejong University Museum

Located at the eastern end of the campus, the Sejong University Museum exhibits a collection of artifacts and antiques collected by the founders of the university. They have been donated to the university for the purpose of academic research. The history of the museum dates back to 1959. The museum moved to its current location in 1979, when the collection moved from its original location at the ChoongMooRo campus. The collection includes royal regalia, court dresses, personal ornaments, pendants, Korean traditional ink paintings, calligraphies and pottery. The museum is involved in excavation projects. The museum is open to the public and the admission is free. There is a small lake named to 'Asadal' in front of museum.

Traditions and student activities
Sejong University was named after King Sejong the Great, the fourth king of the Chosun Dynasty, who has introduced Hangul, the native phonetic alphabet system for the Korean language.

Sejong University offers 90 kinds of scholarship to its students, including the Sejong Scholarship. Student facilities include a 2,800-seat multi-purpose performance hall, main athletic field, sports complex, tennis courts, health clinic, restaurants, cafeteria, coffee shops, bank, post office, bookstore, stationery store, and travel agency.

Dae Dong Je
Dae Dong Je is a university-wide festival held during the fourth week of May every year to celebrate the university's birthday. The students celebrate with events that include concerts, artistic performances, film festivals and exhibitions.

Student clubs
There are 45 student clubs.

Notable people

Alumni
Chungha, singer
Gong Hyo-jin, actress
Guus Hiddink, football coach
Kang Hyung-gu, singer (PENTAGON)
Han Ji-hye, actress
Kang In-soo, singer (Myname)
Kang Shin-hyo, actor
Kim Bo-mi, actress and singer (M.I.L.K.)
Kim Hee-chan, actor
Kim So-hye, actress and singer
Kim Sung-eun, actress
Kyeon Mi-ri, actress and singer
Lee Ah-hyun, actress
Lee Da-hee, actress
Lee Joon-ik, film director
Lee Se-eun, actress
Lee Seo-won, actor
Nam In-soon, activist and politician
Oh Chang-seok, actor
Park Hee-von, actress and singer (M.I.L.K.)
Park Sung-woo, Produce 101 Season 2 
Shim Ji-ho, actor
Shin Hye-sun, actress
Shin Soo-ji, rhythmic gymnast
Song Hye-kyo, actress
Yang Seung-ho, singer (MBLAQ)
Yeon Woo-jin, actor
Yoo Ha, film director, screenwriter and poet
Yoo Yeon-seok, actor
Yoon Jin-yi, actress
Yoon Young-ah, actress

Faculty
The university has nationally renowned celebrities on faculty. They include:
Han Su-san, Korean language and literature, writer, author of a number of bestselling novels, including Bucho (English title: Floating Grass, 1977); Raven (2003); and For Forgiveness (2010);
Lee Hyun-se, cartoon and animation; received the Presidential Award for Cartoons; chairs the Korean Cartoonists Association; best known for Armageddon; Mythology of the Heavens; and Nambul: War Stories;
Lee Soon-jae, Chair Professor, film art, TV/film actor; best known for his award-winning role in High Kick! (2007);

Affiliated institutions

Sejong University Library
Established in 1947, the library was renovated as a 12-story building in 2000. It houses 840,000 books, 1,500 journal subscriptions, 20,000 e-journals and 23,000 e-books. It has reading rooms with 3,200 seats and group study areas. It is the first WTO library in Korea.

Continuing Education Center
The Continuing Education Center complements the education provided by existing universities and offers open and lifelong learning opportunities. It deals with the Sejong Global Program for Studying Abroad, Specialized Program for Casino Dealer Course, Digital Contents, Culinary and Food Service Business, Hotel Business, Physical Education, Music (Piano) and runs a bachelor's degree program based on Academic Credit Bank System.

Information Services & Technology Center
The Information Services & Technology Center (ITSC) provides information technology support and its related services for all Sejong students, faculty, and staff. Support and services include operation and maintenance of the IT infrastructure such as leading-edge wired and wireless networks, servers, etc., protection of administrative and academic systems and their data, and development and operation of the unified system of the university information technologies.

The Sejong International Language Institute
Sejong International Language Institute provides language programs for three languages: Korean, English and Chinese. The language programs being offered are Korean language programs at six levels (beginner's, Intermediate and advanced); English as Second language programs (English for Specific Purpose, English for Global Communication skills in Business, and English for Global leaders); Chinese language programs (Chinese Character class and Chinese for Communication skills in Business).

References

External links
Official school website, in English
Official school website, in Korean

 
Educational institutions established in 1940
Private universities and colleges in South Korea
Universities and colleges in Seoul
Animation schools in South Korea
1940 establishments in Korea
Gwangjin District